To Kill the Potemkin is a novel by Mark Joseph originally published in 1986.  As a paperback, it spent four weeks on The New York Times bestseller list in July and August 1987.

Plot summary
In 1968, a dangerous period of the Cold War, U.S. and Soviet forces engage in brinkmanship across the world. At sea, their submarines play a dangerous cat-and-mouse game. To Kill the Potemkin tells the story of a confrontation between these submarines - one being a new and advanced class of submarine whose existence must remain a secret.

Jack Sorensen, one of the Navy's best sonar operators, is sonar chief of USS Barracuda, a nuclear-powered Skipjack-class submarine. Sorenson is a veteran who jokes about submarine warfare as a game (which he calls "Cowboys and Cossacks"), and he's determined to never lose. Using his sonar gear, Sorensen can find and identify submarines as few others can. Fogerty, a promising but inexperienced sonar analyst newly assigned to Barracuda, is determined to learn from Sorensen. Sorenson is something of an eccentric and also has a drug addiction (with drugs provided by one of the vessel's medical officers) and when in port, as a heavy drinker and partier, but this is tolerated because his determination and expertise make him so valuable.

The novel begins as Barracuda departs its east coast base for the Mediterranean Sea. Once there, Barracuda engages in anti-submarine warfare exercises with other Western submarines. Its mission is to "hunt" the U.S. Navy's 6th Fleet and the flagship, the aircraft carrier. The Barracuda "sinks" several of the American submarines playing the Soviet Navy vessels. The drill is interrupted by the appearance of a vessel that Fogarty correctly determines, that one of the submarines, which has the sonar signature of the American submarine USS Swordfish, is actually a Soviet submarine using special gear to mask its identity.

The story then shifts to the bridge of the other submarine, which in fact is a Soviet vessel, and the first of new class of submarine. The first of its kind, Potemkin is equipped with an experimental stereo/sonar system designed to reproduce recorded tapes of American, British, and other submarines to fool the sonar nets stationed in the Pacific and Atlantic Oceans. As the Potemkin places itself into the Western navies' exercise, the political officer takes command of the vessel and places the captain under arrest for his repeated insults against the political officer and what he deems "un-Soviet remarks". Unfortunately, his incompetence leads to a collision with Barracuda. The American submarine is damaged in the bow area and the compartment is evacuated. Sorenson records the Soviet vessel sinking, and breaking up (being crushed by the water pressure as it sinks) on the sonar equipment. To his amazement, he hears what he thinks is torpedo being fired from the sinking vessel before it plunges to the ocean floor. The tape is sealed under orders from the submarine's captain. Everyone, the officers and crew, are all stunned and amazed to think that they managed to sink a ship of the Soviet Navy and are terrified of what the Soviets may do in retaliation. The injured vessel makes its way back to port and dry-dock for repairs.

While Barracuda survives and reports the accident to higher authorities, it is revealed that the Soviet ship was damaged by the collision but was not sunk. It was able to duplicate the sound of an actual submarine breaking up and playing it through the sophisticated stereo system. Potemkin was seriously damaged; the ship briefly capsized, causing the reactor to automatically scram.

Sorenson soon comes to suspect that the mystery sub did not really sink. Unbeknownst to the superior officers of the ship, he made a separate recording of the collision and the sinking and after listening to it, suspects something is wrong. The sound mistaken for the torpedo firing was actually the Soviet's electric motors driving the submarine away. He tells the captain of the sub his theory and he comes to believe him. When titanium fragments are found on a repaired portion of the bow that came contact with the other submarine during the collision, the crew now have reason to believe that there is a revolutionary class of submarine, using titanium instead of high-tensile steel, is in service with the Soviet Navy and it is still on the loose somewhere in the Med and most likely on the way to the Atlantic. The new class is designated an Alfa class submarine. The American vessel is assigned the top-secret mission of tracking down the Potemkin.

With the ship's zampolit under arrest for negligence and the captain back in command, Potemkin makes a break for the Atlantic Ocean and a rendezvous with Soviet vessels working undercover in Cuba. The environmental system was damaged in the collision so the atmosphere can not be maintained leading to a build-up of carbon dioxide that slowly poisons the crew. Potemkin is unable to escape the Mediterranean before being located by Barracuda. Nevertheless, once out in the open Atlantic Ocean, the Soviet ship reaches full speed, and outpaces Barracuda - which, as a Skipjack-class submarine, is one of the fastest submarines in the world.

Potemkin reaches Cuba and makes a rendezvous with the secret submarine stationed off the coast. This was supposed to be a top-secret meeting because of the Cuban Missile Crisis no Soviet vessels were supposed to be operating within Cuba's waters. Just as the two vessels are about to make contact, Barracuda arrives on the scene. Crew members on all three vessels realize the disastrous consequences of the Barracudas arrival at that exact time. The Russians realize that the American must be sunk from reporting the presence of Soviet vessels in Cuba's waters. Potemkin fires first but the torpedo misses. The Soviet vessel is too deep to shoot with the standard American torpedo so Sorenson orders the firing of a nuclear Mk 45 ASTOR torpedo. The explosion from the nuclear torpedo destroys the Potemkin and all the crew members. Sorenson and Fogarty retire to Sorenson's bunk. All the crewmen of the sub are horrified to realize they have just committed an act of war. The torpedo that was fired earlier by the Russian sub malfunctions and goes to "active seeking" mode and homes in on the noise made by Barracuda'''s reactor pumps. The explosion blows the American sub in two; the vessel sinks in eight-tenths of a second and is crushed by the pressure of the deep sea, killing the whole crew.

Historical basis
The time and place setting of To Kill the Potemkin parallel those of the Scorpion, which had been involved in operations in the Mediterranean Sea in 1968. A real scorpion is kept aboard Barracuda as the boat's mascot.

Since 1968, a willful Soviet attack has been offered as one of several explanations for the loss of Scorpion. At least two books - All Hands Down: The True Story of the Soviet Attack on the USS Scorpion by Kenneth Sewell and Jerome Preisler, and Scorpion Down: Sunk by the Soviets, Buried by the Pentagon: The Untold Story of the USS Scorpion by Ed Offley - claim that the Soviets sank Scorpion in retaliation for the loss of one their submarine K-129'' earlier that year.

Reviews
Krystal, Arthur. "The Cold War Takes a Dive; To Kill the Potemkin", Washington Post, Page C3, 1 September 1986.
Clark, G. "Silent war beneath the waves," The Courier-Mail, 19 September 1987.
van Rjndt, Phillip. "Shattering myths of US might," Toronto Star, Page M7, 27 September 1986.

References

1986 novels
Novels set during the Cold War
Submarines in fiction
Fiction set in 1968